Clarkson House is a Federal-style house in Flaherty, Kentucky, United States that is believed to have been built in 1832.  It was listed on the National Register of Historic Places in 1983.

The two-story building has a hall and parlor plan, and the interior features Federal influence in its woodwork and mantels.  An 1890 tornado caused damage to the foundation; being left unrepaired, the damage had led to sagging by the 1980s.

References

National Register of Historic Places in Meade County, Kentucky
Federal architecture in Kentucky
Houses completed in 1838
Houses in Meade County, Kentucky
Houses on the National Register of Historic Places in Kentucky
1838 establishments in Kentucky